Zebrzydów  is a village in the administrative district of Gmina Marcinowice, within Świdnica County, Lower Silesian Voivodeship, in south-western Poland. Prior to 1945 it was in Germany. Before that it was in Bohemia, and earlier still in Poland.

References

Villages in Świdnica County